Saint Leobinus (died 14 March 557) 
 was a hermit, abbot, and bishop. Born in a peasant family, he became a hermit and a monk of Micy Abbey before being ordained a priest. He was then elected abbot of Brou and in 544, became Bishop of Chartres, succeeding Etherius with the consent of king Childebert I.

References

External links
Saints of March 14: Leobinus
 Saint Lubin

556 deaths
6th-century Frankish saints
Bishops of Chartres
French hermits
Year of birth unknown